The Duo EP: Volume One is a 2007 EP by Kyle Riabko.

This record was recorded over just five days in February at VROOM! Studios. All melodic instruments and vocals on the record are by Kyle Riabko. All percussive instruments are by Dylan Thomas Hermiston.

Track listing
"The Rules Of The Game"
"Slow Down Mary"
"San Francisco"
"Far Away From Home"
"Tease Me Mary"
"Nothing More"

References 

2007 EPs
Kyle Riabko albums